Tammany Young (September 9, 1886 – April 26, 1936) was an American stage and film actor.

Early life
Born in New York City, Young appeared on Broadway in The Front Page (1928) by Ben Hecht and The New Yorkers (1930) by Herbert Fields and Cole Porter. He was considered a "good luck actor" by Broadway producers. He was often cast in bit parts by the likes of The Shuberts, Jed Harris and David Belasco to bring luck to their productions. His reputation in the theater business was such that his likeness was drawn in caricature by Alex Gard for Sardi's restaurant. That picture is now part of the collection of the New York Public Library.

Career
In Hollywood, Young started out in silent films and then was cast in talkies. He often played the stooge (straight man) to W.C. Fields, with whom he appeared in seven films: Sally of the Sawdust (1925), Six of a Kind (1934), You're Telling Me! (1934), The Old Fashioned Way (1934), It's a Gift (1934), Man on the Flying Trapeze (1935), and Poppy (1936).

Gatecrashing
Young also had a reputation as a gate crasher. By claiming to be an ice man, he worked his way into the 1921 Dempsey–Carpentier prize fight in New Jersey, and in 1932 found his way into the Los Angeles Olympics. His exploits were frequently reported by sportswriters of the era.

Death
After a long illness, Young died in his sleep on April 26, 1936  in Hollywood, California, at the age of 49. At the news of Young's death, W.C. Fields fell into a depression and stopped eating and sleeping.

Partial filmography

 The Escape (1914)
 Driven by Fate (1915 short)
 The Foundling (1915)
 The Foundling (1916)
 The Lost Bridegroom (1916)
 Destiny's Toy (1916)
 The Big Sister (1916)
 The Great Secret (1917)
 The Service Star (1918)
 A Regular Girl (1919)
 The Right Way (1921)
 Bits of Life (1921)
 The Man Who (1921)
 The Man Worth While (1921)
 Rainbow (1921)
 When the Desert Calls (1922)
 The Seventh Day (1922)
 John Smith (1922)
 Till We Meet Again (1922)
 The Heart of a Siren (1925)
 The White Monkey (1925)
 The Police Patrol (1925)
 Sally of the Sawdust (1925) (uncredited)
 The Wrongdoers (1925) 
 Camille of the Barbary Coast (1925)
 The Unguarded Hour (1925)
 Womanhandled (1925)
 The Highbinders (1926)
 Blind Alleys (1927)
 The Perfect Sap (1927)
 Roadhouse Nights (1930)
 Follow the Leader (1930)
 The Kid from Spain (1932)
 She Done Him Wrong (1933)
 Hallelujah, I'm a Bum (1933)
 Gold Diggers of 1933 (1933) (uncredited)
 Tugboat Annie (1933)
 Six of a Kind (1934) (uncredited)
 You're Telling Me! (1934) 
 The Old Fashioned Way (1934)
 It's a Gift (1934)
 The Mighty Barnum (1934)
 The Glass Key (1935)
 Man on the Flying Trapeze (1935)
 Little Big Shot (1935)
 Poppy (1936)

See also
Double act
List of caricatures at Sardi's restaurant

References
Notes

Bibliography
Brantley, Ben. The New York Times Book of Broadway. New York: St. Martin's Press, 2001.
Burdick, Loraine. The Shirley Temple Scrapbook'''. Middle Village, N.Y.: Jonathan David Publishers, 1975.
Curtis, James. W.C. Fields A Biography. New York: A.A. Knopf, 2003.
Goldman, Herbert G. Fanny Brice The Original Funny Girl. New York: Oxford University Press, 1992.
Langman, Larry. American Film Cycles The Silent Era. Bibliographies and indexes in the performing arts, no. 22. Westport, Conn: Greenwood Press, 1998.
Louvish, Simon. Mae West It Ain't No Sin. New York: Thomas Dunne Books/St Martin's Griffin, 2007.
Louvish, Simon. Man on the Flying Trapeze The Life and Times of W.C. Fields. New York: W.W. Norton, 1999.
Mast, Gerald. The Comic Mind; Comedy and the Movies'. Indianapolis: Bobbs-Merrill, 1973.
Rhodes, Gary. Lugosi His Life in Films, on Stage, and in the Hearts of Horror Lovers''. Jefferson, N.C.: McFarland & Company, 1997.

External links

 

1886 births
1936 deaths
American male film actors
American male stage actors
American male silent film actors
20th-century American male actors
Male actors from New York City